The Deodhar Trophy in 2005–06 was a cricket competition played in India. The competition was a 50-over one-day competition, and was competed for by the five zonal teams in India. The 2005-06 competition was played in the Central Zone, and was won by the North Zone.

Matches

Central Zone v West Zone (25 February)
Central Zone (4 pts) beat West Zone (0 pts) by 3 wickets

East Zone v South Zone (25 February)
South Zone (4) beat East Zone (0) by 3 wickets

Central Zone v North Zone (28 February)
North Zone (4) beat Central Zone (0) by 14 runs

East Zone v West Zone (28 February)
West Zone (4) beat East Zone (0) by 4 wickets

Central Zone v South Zone (3 March)
South Zone (5) beat Central Zone (-1) by 80 runs

North Zone v West Zone (3 March)
West Zone (4) beat North Zone (0) by 8 wickets

Central Zone v East Zone (6 March)
Central Zone (4) beat East Zone (0) by 1 wicket

North Zone v South Zone (6 March)
North Zone (5) beat South Zone (-1) by 74 runs

East Zone v North Zone (9 March)
North Zone (4) beat East Zone (0) by 51 runs (VJD method)

South Zone v West Zone (9 March)
South Zone (4) beat West Zone (0) by 2 runs

Final table

2005–06 Indian cricket season